The 2022 Arizona State Sun Devils softball team represented Arizona State University in the 2022 NCAA Division I softball season. The Sun Devils were coached by Trisha Ford, in her sixth season. The Sun Devils played their home games at Alberta B. Farrington Softball Stadium and competed in the Pac-12 Conference.

Personnel

Roster

Coaches

Schedule

|-
! colspan=2 style=""| Regular Season: 13–1 (Home: 6–0; Away: 7–1; Neutral: 0–0)
|- valign="top" 
|

|- 
|

|-
|

|- 
|

|}
Source:

Rankings

References

Arizona State
Arizona State Sun Devils softball
Arizona State Sun Devils softball seasons
Arizona State